OKB Gidropress is a Russian state construction office which works on the design, analysis, development, and production of nuclear power plant reactors, most notably the VVER range. OKB stands for experimental design bureau (опытно-конструкторское бюро, opytno-konstruktorskoe bjuro).

History
The company was established by the decree of Council of People's Commissars of the USSR on January 28, 1946 by the order of the People’s Commissar of the USSR heavy engineering on February 1, 1946.

Reactors
A list of some reactors under her flagship or participation:
VVER and its variants
VKT-12
SVBR-10
SVBR-100
Angstrem
VT-1 reactor
BM-40A reactor
BREST-OD-300
BN-800 reactor
BN-1200 reactor

References

External links

OKB Gidropress home page (english)

Nuclear technology companies of Russia
Technology companies established in 1946
Companies of the Soviet Union
Rosatom
1946 establishments in the Soviet Union
Nuclear technology in the Soviet Union
Companies based in Moscow Oblast
Design bureaus